Personal Assets Trust is a large British investment trust. The company is listed on the London Stock Exchange and is a constituent of the FTSE 250 Index. The chairman is Hamish Buchan.

History
The company was established through a rights issue by a much larger fund, Atlantic Assets, managed by Ivory and Sime, in 1983. In 1990 an asset manager with Ivory and Sime, Ian Rushbrook, took over the management of the company and decided that it should be "run expressly for private investors". Over the next 25 years, he grew the business significantly and also used it as a vehicle to protect his own family's financial interests.

References

External links
 Official site

Companies listed on the London Stock Exchange